Blue ash, Fraxinus quadrangulata, is a species of ash native primarily to the Midwestern United States.

Blue Ash may also refer to:

 Fraxinus pennsylvanica, a tree native to eastern and central North America
 Blue Ash, Ohio, a city located in Hamilton County, Ohio
 Blue Ash Air Station, an Air National Guard facility located in Blue Ash, Ohio
 Blue Ash (band), a band in the United States

See also
 Blue tree (disambiguation)
 Ash (disambiguation)